The ladies' individual skating event was held as part of the figure skating at the 1952 Winter Olympics. It was the eighth appearance of the event, which had previously been held twice at the Summer Olympics in 1908 and 1920 and at all five Winter Games from 1924 onward. The competition was held from 16 to 20 February 1952. Twenty-five figure skaters from twelve nations competed.

Results

Referee:
  Kenneth M. Beaumont

Assistant Referee:
  Karen Klæboe

Judges:
  Harold G. Storke
  Joseph Wilson
  Fritz Schober
  Henri Mügeli
  Per Reiertsen
  Donald H. Gilchrist
  Franz Heinlein
  Martti Gyldén
  Gérard Rodrigues Henriques

References

Figure skating at the 1952 Winter Olympics